Polaroid B.V. (trading as Polaroid) is a Dutch photography company that manufactures instant film for its original cameras as well as for select Polaroid Corporation instant cameras.

Polaroid B.V. was founded in 2008 as The Impossible Project (sometimes known as Impossible). In 2017, Polaroid Corporation's brand and intellectual property were acquired by Impossible Project's largest shareholder and the company was rebranded as Polaroid Originals. In March 2020, Polaroid Originals was shortened to Polaroid.

History 

The Impossible Project was founded in 2008 after Polaroid announced in February of that year that it would stop producing film for Polaroid cameras. The founders are Florian Kaps, André Bosman and Marwan Saba. In June 2008, Kaps and Bosman met at the Polaroid factory's closing event and decided to found a company to produce materials for Polaroid cameras. In October 2008, Impossible bought the production machinery from Polaroid for $3.1 million and leased a building, called Building Noord, which was formerly part of the Polaroid plant in Enschede, Netherlands. The company has offices in Vienna, Berlin, New York City and Tokyo. It leased the Polaroid production plant and developed new instant film products for use in some existing Polaroid cameras, beginning mass production and sales in 2010. They generated US$270,000 in profit on US$4 million in revenue and sold 500,000+ units.

In January 2012, the company announced that it and Polaroid would launch a range of collectible products, called The Polaroid Classic range, that originate from different periods of Polaroid's history. Between six and ten products will be released each year. In July 2013, Florian Kaps announced his 'retirement' from the project and Creed O'Hanlon took over the role as CEO.

In December 2014, The Impossible Project announced that Oskar Smołokowski would be their new CEO and Creed O'Hanlon would become the Executive Chairman of Impossible's management board.

Polaroid (Impossible BV) has licensed its name to stores in Germany, Spain and London.

In May 2017, Impossible's largest shareholder acquired the brand and intellectual property of the original Polaroid corporation. Impossible Project was renamed Polaroid Originals in September 2017. In March 2020, the company rebranded again, changing its name to simply Polaroid.

Products

Instant film 

Polaroid manufactures SX-70 and 600 film, i-Type film, Go film, and large format 8x10 film. Unlike the original large format 8x10 film, the new 8x10 is an integral film with the positive and the negative kept together. The wide-format Spectra film, produced between 2010 and 2019, was discontinued in October 2019 as a result of technical issues and motor jams from ejecting new film.

The SX-70, 600, and i-Type film all have the same format, 4.2 x 3.5 in (107 mm x 88 mm) with a 3.1 x 3.1 in (79 mm x 79 mm) square image area. The smaller-format Go film measures 2.623 x 2.122 in (66.6 mm x 53.9 mm) with a 1.851 x 1.811 in (47 mm x 46 mm) image area. The integral zinc-chloride battery of the SX-70 and 600 is replaced with a lithium-ion system in Impossible remakes. The i-Type and Go film, designed for use in cameras with integrated rechargeable batteries, lack the integrated battery of the SX-70 and 600 film. Current SX-70 films has a film speed of ISO 160; all other lines are ISO 640. Except for the 8x10 film (which comes in 10 sheets per box), all films are sold in units of 8 exposures.

In addition to the usual white-framed film, Polaroid BV makes 600 and i-Type films with special frame colors, patterns, and/or shapes. These can be limited in quantity and become discontinued earlier. For the classical SX-70 and 600 series, many earlier "test versions" are listed as well.

Future and other formats 
The Impossible Project has stated that they will not manufacture packfilm "in the foreseeable future", due to the investment required, and cannot produce 4x5, Type 100, or Type 80 films, Polaroid 500 film and I-Zone film as they do not have the production machinery. These were disassembled along with the factories that used to produce the film when Polaroid filed for Chapter 11.

Impossible founder Florian Kaps left the company in July 2013 and later founded a coffee house and photo studio in Vienna called SUPERSENSE. Kaps revealed through a series of blog posts and interviews in 2016 that he had personally approached Fuji about acquiring their machinery in an attempt to rescue their soon-to-be discontinued FP3000b and FP100b packfilm products. Kaps was unsuccessful in this pursuit, but motivated by his disappointment in Fuji's decision, he established the Analogue Product Institute (API) with the goal of "developing a NEW generation of analog instant packfilm [and] Establishing a rich network of new suppliers, manufacturers and financiers from all over the world".

Hardware 
Polaroid produces its own hardware and refurbishes Polaroid Corporation cameras.

Instant Lab 
The Instant Lab is a device that exposes digital images from a smartphone onto analog instant film, using the light produced by the screen.

The first generation of the Instant Lab was introduced in October 2013. It supports the iPhone 4, 4s, 5, 5c and 5s, as well as the iPod Touch. The device was produced after a successful crowd-funding campaign on Kickstarter.

Impossible Project introduced a new battery-less film cartridge design for use with the Instant Lab. The system, now known as the i-Type system, is a Polaroid 600-type cartridge stripped of the battery. The Instant Lab is internally-powered and does not rely on the battery to work. It works with all Polaroid square film formats, that is the original 600, the battery-less i-Type, and the less sensitive SX-70.

A "universal cradle" was later released for Instant Lab 1.0 to accommodate different screen sizes on the iPhone 6 and various Android phones. It turns the device into the newer Instant Lab Universal (2015), a new generation announced at Photokina 2014.

Hi•Print 
Released in August 2020 the Hi•Print is a bluetooth portable printer that uses dye-sublimation to create 2.1 inch x 3.4 inch prints with an adhesive backing to be used like a sticker. The printer uses 10 pack cartridges containing both paper and dyes. Much like the Instant Lab, the device is controlled via an app. Unlike Polaroid's other hardware, the Hi•Print is an entirely digital system.

Instant cameras

Impossible I-1 
In 2016, Impossible started manufacturing its own instant camera, the Impossible I-1. It is a part of the company's original i-Type system, which uses its new i-Type film and 600 film. It features Bluetooth connectivity for remote control, double-exposure, advanced manual settings, among other features. It was designed by Teenage Engineering.

Polaroid OneStep 2 
In September 2017, Polaroid Originals announced the Polaroid OneStep 2 instant film camera that uses its i-Type film and 600 film. In the first version of this camera, framing is done by looking through a window on the back of the camera. Later in 2018, the company released a version with a built-in viewfinder that makes framing more accurate, the OneStep 2 Viewfinder.

Polaroid OneStep+ 
In September 2018, Polaroid Originals introduced the Polaroid OneStep+ instant film camera that uses i-Type film and 600 film. The OneStep+ has built-in Bluetooth wireless technology that allows the camera to be paired with the Polaroid Originals app on an iOS or Android smartphone or tablet. This enables six new features: remote trigger, double exposure, light painting, self timer (with up to a 12 s countdown), manual mode (controlling aperture, shutter speed, flash intensity and photos ejection) and noise trigger.
The OneStep+ has an additional portrait lens, with minimum focusing distance of 30 cm. A slide toggle on the top of the camera switches between the two lenses.

The camera also includes a higher-capacity battery (recharged through a microUSB adapter), a built-in flash, and a viewfinder.

Polaroid Now 
In March 2020, along with Polaroid Originals rebranding to Polaroid, the Polaroid Now was released. Much like the OneStep+ the Now uses 600 or i-Type film and features 2 stage Autofocus without the need to manually change focus points, a Self-timer and built-in flash. Unlike previous cameras, Exposure compensation is adjusted by holding the flash button and shown using the frame counter window. The Now comes in multiple colours with a more rounded design.

Polaroid Go 
In April 2021, Polaroid announced the Polaroid Go camera along with Polaroid Go film. Both the Go camera and Go film are considered 'mini' versions of the 'Now' series. The camera measures 5.9 x 3.3 x 2.4 inches, with shutter speeds of 1/30 to 1/125 and a f/12 & f/52 34mm lens (35mm equivalent). The film measures 2.6 x 2.1 inches and is rated at 640 ISO.

Polaroid Now+ 
In August 2021, Polaroid unveiled the Polaroid Now+ camera, which is a revamped version of the 2020 Polaroid Now model. This version of the camera is compatible with both 600 and i-Type film, and comes with 5 lens filter accessories. The camera can also access two additional tools available through the Polaroid mobile app — aperture priority and tripod mode.

Media 
The complexity of developing new generations of (prototype) instant film was depicted in the 2017 documentary Instant Dreams. Parts of the documentary were shot on location at Polaroid Originals 30 minute photo labs and production facilities in the Netherlands and Germany and includes Chief Technical Officer Stephen Herchen.

An Impossible Project (2020) is a documentary  that follows Florian "Doc" Kaps and The Impossible Project from 2014, through the rebranding to Polaroid Originals, Supersense and Kaps' other projects. The film includes interviews with Christopher Bonanos, Kaps, Oskar Smołokowski and others.

References

External links

Polaroid Eyewear
The Polaroid Cube

Manufacturing companies established in 2008
Instant photography
Photographic film makers
Photography companies of the Netherlands
Dutch companies established in 2008